Tengajhar is a village in Kamrup rural district, situated in north bank of river Brahmaputra

Transport
The village is accessible through, National Highway 37, connected to nearby towns and cities with regular buses and other modes of transportation.

See also
 Udiana
 Uzankuri

References

Villages in Kamrup district